Marjolein Dijkstra (born 1967) is a Dutch condensed matter physicist. She works as a professor in the Debye Institute for NanoMaterials Science at Utrecht University, and the Soft Condensed Matter group of the Department of Physics and Astronomy at Utrecht.

Education and career
Dijkstra was born on 26 September 1967 in The Hague.
She earned two master's degrees, one in chemical engineering in 1990 from Wageningen University under the supervision of Yehudi K. Levine and Tjeerd Schaafsma, and another in experimental physics in 1990 from Utrecht University under the supervision of Daan Frenkel. She completed her Ph.D. in 1994, with Frenkel as her doctoral advisor. Her dissertation was The effect of entropy on the structure and stability of complex fluids.

After postdoctoral research at the University of Oxford with Paul Madden and Jean-Pierre Hansen, at the Shell Research and Technology Centre Amsterdam, and at Bristol University with Michael P. Allen and Robert Evans, she joined the Utrecht faculty in 1999. She has been a full professor there since 2007, and was named director of the Debye Institute in 2015.

In spring 2020 Marjolein Dijkstra received an ERC Advanced Grant research funding for her project Rational Design of Soft Hierarchical Materials with Responsive Functionalities: Machine learning Soft Matter to create Soft Machines..

Recognition
Dijkstra won the Minerva Prize of the Netherlands Organisation for Scientific Research in 2000. This prize is given every two years for outstanding research by a female physicist; Dijkstra won it for her work with René van Roij and Robert Evans on "Phase diagram of highly asymmetric binary hard-sphere mixtures". Dijkstra was elected a member of the Royal Netherlands Academy of Arts and Sciences in 2020.

References

External links
Home page

1967 births
Living people
21st-century Dutch physicists
Dutch women physicists
Condensed matter physicists
Members of the Royal Netherlands Academy of Arts and Sciences
Utrecht University alumni
Academic staff of Utrecht University
Wageningen University and Research alumni